Can We Get Together is a charity compilation album benefiting those affected by the assassination attempt on congresswoman Gabby Giffords. The project was the creative vision of University of Arizona law student Robert Current to benefit the victims that didn't have insurance, with proceeds to Homicide Survivors of Tucson. The album featured 117 Southern Arizona musicians, plus various local Tucson studios, engineers, and producers, and was released through the iTunes Store, Amazon.com and in a double CD with national distribution on March 14, 2011 through unknown indie label CoSeismic Records. Later that year the concept was taken by Luz de Vida, another album featuring some of the same artists as Can We Get Together.

The album features a wide range of music from University of Arizona music professors performing classical works, to local Tucson musicians performing styles including Rap, Hip-Hop, Punk Rock, Christian, Blues, Big Band Swing, Reggae, Folk, Adult Contemporary, and Mariachi music.  Many of the artists had a close personal connection to the 2011 Tucson shooting, and several songs were written specifically about the shooting.

Studios in Southern Arizona that contributed time listed in the liner notes include Audioconfusion Studios, Billy Joseph Productions, Black Scorpion and Far Out Musicians, Chukshon Recording Studio, Daveguitar Sound, Delicious Delicious, Draco Studios, Gary Ray Recordings, Jack Miller Productions, JTG Studio, Live Sound at Crowder Hall at University of Arizona, Live Sound at Pima Community College Recital Hall, Luna Studios, Next Door Studios, OG7 Studios, The Den Studios, The University of Arizona School of Music, Wavelab, and Wet Kitchen Studios.

Reception

The country music single “Ken I Go Fishin'” by the Chip Ritter Band was released two weeks before the album on March 1, 2011 to promote it. The radio version is shorter than the album version.

Local media attention for Can We Get Together was very high in Tucson, receiving praise for its charitable purpose and large scale accomplishment based entirely locally without outside funding.  One source stated, "Punk rock bands and sentimental tribute albums don't normally go hand in hand, but Wax 78 is no typical punk band", and went on to state that their participation "belies the punk genre's reputation for hard-edged nihilism".

However, the album did not receive wide acknowledgment outside of Tucson, and what few international reviews can be found state it was a slightly above average commercial release. Cross Rhythms gave it only 7 of 10 stars saying the title track was “rather dull and repetitive effort” and after praising several songs, they noted “some of the tracks are of little more than demo quality but with handsomely designed packaging and such a worthy cause it is easy to overlook a few damp squibs.”

With local attention building, the small indie album was quickly and completely eclipsed by Songs for Japan, a charity album released 11 days later on March 25. The latter album highlighted a larger tragedy affecting more people, featured internationally known artists, was promoted by the music industry's "big four" record labels (EMI, Sony, Universal, and Warner), featured 8 more songs (38 vs. 30) and sold for less than half the price. Ironically, the Can We Get Together album's first track on disk two was titled “Tsunami” (which SeaShell Radio had previously performed at a vigil for Giffords and the other shooting victims) and was written long before the Japanese tsunami.

Track listing 

The album features 30 tracks.

References 

2011 compilation albums
Charity albums